The Action for Change (AC) was a political party in Mauritania. The party was led by Messaoud Ould Belkheir, and campaigned for greater rights for Mauritania's Haratin and black populations. The party was banned and dissolved in January 2002.

History

Electoral history
The first election contested by the AC was the 1996 parliamentary election, with the party coming third, with 5.3% of the vote and 1 seat in parliament.

The party also went on to contest the 2001 parliamentary election, winning 5.5% of the popular vote and 4 out of 81 seats.

Dissolution
The party was banned in January 2002 following accusations by the government that the party threatened Mauritanian national unity and was threatening Mauritania's relations with Senegal. Communications Minister Chyakh Ould Ely accused the party of being racist and violent. The party was allowed to keep its four parliamentary seats.

Messaoud Ould Belkheir, the leader of the AC strongly denied the allegations made against the party, and claimed that the party was instead being banned as part of a crackdown in dissent by the government, and also because of the parties recent electoral gains.

References

Banned political parties
Black political parties
Defunct political parties in Mauritania
Political parties established in 1996
Political parties disestablished in 2002
2002 disestablishments in Africa